Allen Aber Adams (August 22, 1900 – June 5, 1985) was an American politician in the state of Washington. He served in the Washington House of Representatives from 1969 to 1981.

References

1985 deaths
1900 births
Politicians from Bellingham, Washington
Democratic Party members of the Washington House of Representatives
20th-century American politicians